David Fiegen (born 3 September 1984 in Esch-sur-Alzette) is a Luxembourgian middle distance runner who specializes in the 800 metres.

He won the silver medal at the 2006 European Athletics Championships in Gothenburg, the first ever medal in the history of the championships for an athlete from Luxembourg. He also competed at the 2004 Olympics, and won a bronze medal at the 2002 World Junior Championships.

Achievements

External links

Luxembourgian male middle-distance runners
Athletes (track and field) at the 2004 Summer Olympics
Olympic athletes of Luxembourg
1984 births
Living people
Sportspeople from Esch-sur-Alzette
European Athletics Championships medalists
World Athletics Championships athletes for Luxembourg